Pelican Narrows may refer to:

Pelican Narrows, Alberta
Pelican Narrows, Saskatchewan
Pelican Narrows Airport, Saskatchewan